The Ford family is a Canadian political family, who have English heritage. It includes the former Toronto Mayor Rob Ford and current Ontario Premier and leader of the Progressive Conservative Party of Ontario, Doug Ford.

Notable members 

 Doug Ford Sr. (1933 – 2006) Canadian businessperson and Ontario politician. He was a Progressive Conservative member of the Legislative Assembly of Ontario from 1995 to 1999 representing the riding of Etobicoke—Humber. He was the father of Rob Ford, and Doug Ford.
 Doug Ford (born 1964) Canadian politician and businessperson who has served as the 26th and current premier of Ontario since June 2018 and leader of the Progressive Conservative Party of Ontario since March 2018. He represents the Toronto riding of Etobicoke North in the Legislative Assembly of Ontario.
 Rob Ford (1969 – 2016) was a Canadian politician and businessperson who served as the 64th mayor of Toronto from 2010 to 2014. Before and after his term as mayor, Ford was a city councillor representing Ward 2 Etobicoke North. He was first elected to Toronto City Council in the 2000 Toronto municipal election, and was re-elected to his council seat twice.
 Krista Haynes (née Ford; born 1991) is a former Canadian professional women's American football player and conspiracy theorist. She is a daughter of Doug Ford. She was the captain the Legends Football League team Toronto Triumph.
 Michael Ford (born Michael Douglas Aldo Ford Stirpe; 1994) is a Canadian politician who has been the Ontario minister of citizenship and multiculturalism since June 24, 2022. A member of the Progressive Conservative (PC) Party, he has represented York South—Weston in the Legislative Assembly of Ontario since 2022. Ford previously served on Toronto City Council from 2016 to 2022. First elected as a Toronto District School Board trustee in 2014, he later won a 2016 by-election for the council seat which was vacated upon the death of Rob Ford, before he was elected as a member of Provincial Parliament in 2022. He is the nephew of Doug Ford and Rob Ford.

Ancestry 
The family have English heritage. The Toronto Sun cited online sources indicating that Doug and Rob Ford's paternal grandfather Ernest Ford moved from England to Canada in 1902 at the age of 11 as part of the Home Children immigration scheme.

Offices held 

 Legislative Assembly of Ontario member
 1995 – 1996 (Doug Ford Sr.)
 2018 – present (Doug Ford)
 Premier of Ontario
 2018 – present
 Progressive Conservative Party of Ontario leader
 2018 – present
 Mayor of Toronto
 2010 – 2014
 Toronto city councillor
 2010 – 2014 (Doug Ford Sr.)
 2000 – 2010 (Rob Ford)
 2010 – 2014 (Doug Ford)
 2018 – 2022 (Michael Ford)
 Ontario Minister of Citizenship and Multiculturalism
 2022 – present
 Toronto District School Board trustee
 2014 – 2016

See also 

 Trudeau family
 Mulroney family
 Hardisty family

References 

Canadian families
Political families of Canada
Ford political family
Politicians from Toronto